is a Japanese four-panel manga series written and illustrated by Kaori Hanzawa. It made its first appearance in Houbunsha's Manga Time Kirara Max magazine with the May 2014 issue. An anime television series adaptation by Nexus aired in Japan between April and June 2018.

Plot
Kaoruko Moeta, a yonkoma manga artist who goes by the pen name "Kaos", is a freshman in high school. After her manga ranks at the bottom of a reader survey, her editor recommends that she enter a special dormitory for manga artists. Kaoruko's roommates are shōjo manga artist Koyume Koizuka, teen romance manga artist Ruki Irokawa, and shōnen manga artist Tsubasa Katsuki. The girls support each other as they work to create their best manga series.

Characters
 

A shy 4-koma manga artist who moves into the Bunhousha Dormitory to improve her manga.  As she looks much younger than she is, her appearance often becomes the butt of jokes and a target of others' affection.
 

A shōjo manga artist who struggles with drawing boys. She develops a crush on Tsubasa. She has no experience with romance, so she is always nervous about the quality of her romantic manga and the nature of her "strange" feelings for Tsubasa as another girl.
 

A serialized teens' love manga artist. She originally wanted to draw cute animal manga for children, but her ability to draw big-breasted women led to her drawing erotic manga.
 

A serialized shōnen manga artist with a boyish appearance. She will often put herself in the role of one of her characters when working on her manga. Because of her handsome appearance, other girls often fall in love with her making her very popular in school, the most notable example of which is Koyume. She comes from a rich family, keeping her hair long and adopting a different personality while at home.

The housemother at the Bunhousha Dormitory, who is a former yuri manga artist. 

Kaoruko's editor.

The strict homeroom teacher of Kaoruko's class and a former yaoi manga artist. 

A horror manga artist who enjoys the screams of others.
	

Kaoruko's mother.
 

Ruki's younger sister.
 

A cat who is taken in by the dorm residents due to its similarities to Kaos.

Media

Manga
Comic Girls is a four-panel series written and illustrated by Kaori Hanzawa. It made its first appearance in Houbunsha's seinen manga magazine Manga Time Kirara Max with the May 2014 issue, and began serialization in the magazine with the August 2014 issue. The series will end serialization in the April 2023 issue released on February 17, 2023.

Anime
A 12-episode anime television series adaptation by Nexus aired in Japan between April 5 and June 21, 2018. The series is directed by Yoshinobu Tokumoto, with series composition by Natsuko Takahashi, character designs by Keiko Saito, and music by Kenichiro Suehiro. The series was simulcast by Crunchyroll worldwide except for in Asia and parts of Europe.

Video game
Characters from the series appear alongside other Manga Time Kirara characters in the 2018 mobile RPG, Kirara Fantasia.

Notes

References

External links
  
 

2014 manga
Anime series based on manga
Crunchyroll anime
Houbunsha manga
LGBT in anime and manga
Manga creation in anime and manga
Nexus (animation studio)
Seinen manga
Yonkoma